The Buchara shrew or Pamir shrew (Sorex buchariensis) is a species of mammal in the family Soricidae. It is found in the Pamir Mountains in Tajikistan, Kyrgyzstan, and Uzbekistan. It lives in mountain birch and poplar forests on slopes and piedmonts.

References

Sorex
Mammals of Central Asia
Taxa named by Sergej Ognew
Mammals described in 1921
Taxonomy articles created by Polbot